Steve Drazkowski (born November 27, 1964) is an American politician serving as a member of the Minnesota Senate from District 20, representing all of Wabasha County, large parts of Olmsted County, Goodhue County, and Winona County, and a smaller part of Dakota County. He previously served in the Minnesota House of Representatives.

Early life and education

Drazkowski was born in Winona, Minnesota, and grew up on a farm in Bluff Siding, Wisconsin. He graduated from Cochrane-Fountain City High School and earned a Bachelor of Science in agriculture in 1989 from the University of Wisconsin-River Falls. In 1994, he earned a Master of Education degree from the University of Minnesota.

Career 
Drazkowski is a Minnesota Department of Natural Resources firearms safety instructor, Wabasha County 4-H volunteer, and past president of the Minnesota Forage and Grassland Council.

In 2006, Drazkowski ran unsuccessfully for the District 28 seat in the Minnesota Senate. He subsequently ran for and was elected to the Minnesota House of Representatives in the August 7, 2007 special election held after Representative Steve Sviggum resigned to become Minnesota's Commissioner of Labor and Industry. He was reelected in 2008, 2010, 2012, 2014, 2016, 2018, and 2020.

In 2010, Drazkowski introduced legislation in the Minnesota House modeled after Arizona's controversial immigration law.

In 2012, Drazkowski and radio host Dave Thompson proposed an Employee Freedom Constitutional Amendment, which would require a statewide referendum on amending the Minnesota Constitution to include a right-to-work clause weakening unions.

In early 2019, Drazkowski referred U.S. Representative Ilhan Omar to the Minnesota Campaign Finance and Public Disclosure Board, which enforces Minnesota election ethics rules.

On December 7, 2018, Drazkowski and three other Republican state representatives left the GOP House Caucus to form the New Republican House Caucus. Drazkowski said, "It doesn’t change the fact we’re still Republican. As a matter of fact, our caucus of four is very committed to Republican ideals and values ... We’ll be working very hard to strengthen our party throughout Minnesota, strengthen party units and conservative organizations throughout the state so that we can win the election in two years instead of continuing on a course that could be very similar to the one [November 2018] that really just took 25 percent of our Republican membership in the House." The four members were assigned seats together on the House floor and hired three staff members shortly before the 2019 session began. During the session, they announced several bills that featured their strong interest in constitutional issues and also presented their own budget proposal.

While arguing against a 2023 bill providing Minnesota students with free breakfast and lunch, Drazkowski claimed he had "yet to meet a person in Minnesota that is hungry", had "yet to meet a person in Minnesota that says they don't have access to enough food to eat", and that "hunger is a relative term". A video of Drazkowski making the comments went viral on Twitter and led to the comments receiving national coverage. The bill's sponsor, Democratic state senator Heather Gustafson, tweeted that "1 in 5 students in Sen. Drazkowski's district qualifies for free and reduced lunch".

Electoral history

2020 Race for Minnesota House of Representatives — District 21B
Steve Drazkowski (R) 66.6% (15,647 votes)
Elise Diesslin  (DFL), 33.3% (7,831 votes)
Write-in, 0.1% (24 votes)
2018 Race for Minnesota House of Representatives — District 21B
Steve Drazkowski (R) 63.4% (11,511 votes)
Jonathan Isenor  (DFL), 36.5% (6,619 votes)
Write-in, 0.1% (17 votes)
2016 Race for Minnesota House of Representatives — District 21B
Steve Drazkowski (R) 65.31% (13,688 votes)
Elise Diesslin (DFL), 34.69% (7,270 votes)
2014 Race for Minnesota House of Representatives — District 21B
Steve Drazkowski (R) 63.3% (9,075 votes)
M.A. Schneider (DFL), 36.4% (5,213 votes)
Write-in, 0.3% (41 votes)
2012 Race for Minnesota House of Representatives — District 21B
Steve Drazkowski (R) 58% (11,759 votes)
Bruce Montplaisir (DFL), 42% (8,511 votes)
2010 Race for Minnesota House of Representatives — District 28B
Steve Drazkowski (R) 65.15% (9,669 votes)
Mark Schneider (DFL), 34.77% (5,160 votes)
Write-in, 0.08% (12 votes)
2008 Race for Minnesota House of Representatives — District 28B
Steve Drazkowski (R) 54.75% (10,980 votes)
Linda Pfeilsticker (DFL), 45.13% (9,050 votes)
Write-in, 0.12% (24 votes)
2007 Race for Minnesota House of Representatives — District 28B Special Election
Steve Drazkowski (R) 52.89% (3,762 votes)
Linda Pfeilsticker (DFL), 46.86% (3,333 votes)
Write-in, 0.25% (18 votes)
2006 Race for Minnesota Senate — District 28
Steve Murphy (DFL), 54.26% (17,511 votes)
Steve Drazkowski(R), 45.33% (14,627 votes)
Steve Wilson (Write-In), 0.20% (64 votes)
Write-In 0.21% (68 votes)

Personal life

Drazkowski is a member of the National Rifle Association, Whitetails Unlimited, Ducks Unlimited, and both the Lake City and Frontenac Sportsmens Clubs. He is Catholic, attending the St. Peter and Paul Church in Mazeppa. He is divorced; he and his ex-wife, Laura, have one child. In 2006, before he was elected to the legislature, Drazkowski was arrested and charged with assaulting his then 14-year-old daughter. He was acquitted, but at Laura's request, the judge issued a temporary restraining order against him. He co-owns an online retail business and a shoe store in Winona and resides in Mazeppa.

References

External links

 Rep. Steve Drazkowski Web Page
 Drazkowski Campaign Web Site

Living people
1964 births
People from Wabasha, Minnesota
People from Winona, Minnesota
People from Buffalo County, Wisconsin
University of Wisconsin–River Falls alumni
University of Minnesota College of Education and Human Development alumni
Republican Party members of the Minnesota House of Representatives
University of Wisconsin–River Falls alumni
21st-century American politicians